The Liga ABF 2006–07 was the 50th season of women's handball top flight in Spain since its establishment running from 16 September 2006 to 20 May 2007. Fourteen teams took part in the competition, including newly promoted teams CB Perdoma and AD Sagardía.

Defending champion CB Amadeo Tortajada won its second title with a two points advantage over runner-up BM Sagunto, which also qualified for the Champions League. CBF Elda, SD Itxako and BM Bera Bera followed in European positions like in the previous season, while AH Lleidatana and CB Perdoma were relegated as the two bottom teams. 6th-placed Cleba León was invited to take part in the EHF Cup but refused for financial reasons.

Standings

References

División de Honor Femenina de Balonmano seasons
ABF
2006–07 domestic handball leagues
2006 in women's handball
2007 in women's handball